Sturisomatichthys leightoni is a species of armored catfish of the family Loricariidae endemic to Colombia, where it occurs in the upper Magdalena and Cauca River basins.  This species grows to a length of  SL.

Mark 
The Sturisomatichthys leightoni is about 14 to 18 cm long. Its upper caudal fin is longer than its lower caudal fin. Both of them are elongated and peaked.

Sex differences 
The male Sturisomatichthys leightoni is shorter than the female one and has a short beard (1–2 mm).

Reproduction 
The female lays about 40 eggs. The male fans fresh water on top of the eggs until the babies hatch. This takes about 6–7 days.

Etymology
The catfish is named in honor of Sir Bryan Leighton (1868-1919), who presented the type specimen to the British Museum.

References

 
The German Wikipedia page about the Sturisomatichthys leightoni  :https://de.wikipedia.org/wiki/Zwergst%C3%B6rwels 17.09.19

Harttiini
Endemic fauna of Colombia
Freshwater fish of Colombia
Fish of the Andes
Magdalena River
Taxa named by Charles Tate Regan
Fish described in 1912